Maricar de Mesa (born November 3, 1979) is a Filipino actress known for her antagonistic roles in many TV series like Magkaibang Mundo, Villa Quintana, Once Upon a Kiss, Dragon Lady, Unica Hija and others. She started her career in Bubble Gang, as well as the first GobiGirl of Arnell Ignacio in GoBingo from 1996 to 1999.

Personal life
She was married to basketball player Don Allado, but separated after two years. She has a child named Baby Allianna Sky.

Selected filmography

Television

Movies

References

External links

1979 births
Living people
Actresses from Manila
Filipino television personalities
GMA Network personalities
ABS-CBN personalities